Guðmundur Lárusson (23 November 1925 – 14 January 2010) was an Icelandic sprinter. He competed in the men's 400 metres at the 1952 Summer Olympics.

References

1925 births
2010 deaths
Athletes (track and field) at the 1952 Summer Olympics
Gudmundur Larusson
Gudmundur Larusson
Gudmundur Larusson
Place of birth missing